Zyzzyva is a triannual magazine of writers and artists. It places an emphasis on showcasing emerging voices and never before published writers in addition to the already established. Based in San Francisco, it began publishing in 1985. ZYZZYVA'''s slogan is "The Last Word," referring to "zyzzyva", the last word in the American Heritage Dictionary. A zyzzyva is an American weevil. The accent is on the first syllable.

 Editors 
The founder was Howard Junker. He retired from the magazine in 2010 and named Laura Cogan as editor-in-chief.

 Awards 
Work from the magazine has received the Pushcart Prize and the O. Henry Award and has been included in The Best American Short Stories and The Best American Nonrequired Reading.

Notable Contributors
Notable contributors include Haruki Murakami, Peter Orner, Kay Ryan, Lawrence Ferlinghetti, David Guterson, Tom Bissell, Tatjana Soli, Ron Carlson, Luis Alberto Urrea, Amy Hempel, D.A. Powell, Matthew Dickman, Herbert Gold, Daniel Sada, Adam Johnson, Karl Taro Greenfeld, Richard Misrach, Aimee Bender, Diego Enrique Osorno, Sherman Alexie, Daniel Handler, Adrienne Rich, Robert Hass, Czeslaw Milosz, Wanda Coleman, Raymond Carver, Tom Barbash, William T. Vollmann, Sandow Birk, Kate Folk, Sean Gill, Fabián Martínez Siccardi, Dagoberto Gilb, Ed Ruscha, Richard Diebenkorn, Ursula K. Le Guin, Robert Creeley, and M.F.K. Fisher.

NovelsBoonville, by Robert Mailer Anderson was a "Zyzzyva'' First Novel", published in 2001 by the Creative Arts Book Company.

See also
List of literary magazines

References

External links
 
 Guide to the Zyzzyva records at The Bancroft Library

Visual arts magazines published in the United States
Literary magazines published in the United States
Triannual magazines published in the United States
Magazines established in 1985
Magazines published in San Francisco
1985 establishments in California